Yada Yada is the eighth studio album by Dutch rock and roll and blues group Herman Brood & His Wild Romance. The album, produced by George Kooymans of Golden Earring, was one of many moderately successful albums by Brood in the mid 1980s; it reached #9 on the Dutch album chart on 19 March 1988, and stayed on the chart for 14 weeks.

Track listing

Singles
Three singles came from this album. "Groovin'" and "Babies" failed to chart, but "Sleepin' Bird" (B-side "Cut Me Loose," "Street Flower") reached #27 in the Dutch Top 40 on 2 April 1988, and stayed on the chart for four weeks.

Personnel
Herman Brood - piano, vocals
Rudy Englebert - bass guitar, vocals
Ani Meerman - drums, vocals
David Hollestelle - guitar
Danny Lademacher - guitar, vocals
Otto Cooymans - Additional keyboards

References

1988 albums
Herman Brood & His Wild Romance albums
CBS Records albums